Charles S. Olcott (1864 - May 4, 1935) was an American non-fiction writer. Born in Terre Haute, Indiana, he graduated from DePauw University and worked in publishing as the general manager of the private library of Houghton Mifflin. He was the author of four books, including a two-volume biography of President William McKinley.

Selected works

References

External links
 
Charles S. Olcott on the Internet Archive

1864 births
1935 deaths
People from Terre Haute, Indiana
DePauw University alumni
American non-fiction writers
20th-century American biographers